Gaby Kerpel is a composer born and raised in Argentina.

Kerpel belongs to a Latin electronic music collective known as Zizek.  Under the name King Coya he performs reinterpreted Colombian cumbia music.  

As a composer, his songs include De La Guarda, Fuerza Bruta,  and Carnabailito.

References

Year of birth missing (living people)
Living people
Argentine composers